Manjal Prasadam is an Indian mythological television series which launched on Flowers Television by 28 November 2016

Model turned Actress Ann Mathews  essays the main protagonist of the series along with renowned Bharathanatiyam dancer Kalamandalam Radhika playing the role of Nagamadathamma  and Kalyani Nair portrays the role of Renuka. Nithin Jake Joseph essays the role of a herpetologist. Renowned Malayalam film producer turned actor Sudeep Karat has played a vital role.  The series concluded on 3 February 2017 with 50 episodes.

The show won the Kerala State Television Award in 2017 for the Second Best Tele-serial.

Plot
Manjal Prasadam serial tells story of a family that believes in old Hindu beliefs and sticks to old generation traditions in their living style. A Sarppa Kavu is a place where snakes are worshiped and they are considered like gods giving protection to a family. Turning point of this serial's story is when a new generation girl of this family who studied in city comes to her come with friends. They create some problems and after effect of it is outlined in this beautiful serial Manjal Prasadam.

Cast

Main cast
 Ann Mathews as Vaishnavi
 Kalamandalam Radhika (Kalaradhi) as Muthasshi /   Nagamadathamma/Kunji kutty
 Sanuja as Dakshaki/ Dakshina 
 Kalyani Nair as Renuka
 Sudeep Karat as Unni Thampuran

Recurring cast
Shahana as  Swathy
Nithin Jake Joseph as Eshwar
 Ajoobsha as Sunder
 Sreerag Ram as Rahul
Sayana as Kalyani
 Anil Narayan as Narayanan Namboothiri
Kalamandalam Geethanandan as Bhattathiri
Dr Jamil David as Sreedharan Namboothiri

Airing History

Original airing

References

2014 Indian television series debuts
Malayalam-language television shows
Flowers (TV channel) original programming